Jean-Baptiste Hugues (15 April 1849, in Marseille – 28 October 1930, in Paris) was a French sculptor.

He won the Grand Prix de Rome for sculpture in 1875. He was resident at the Villa Medicis from 1876 to 1879. When he was alive, he gained some fame : his works were exhibited at the Salons and were always commented on by critics and writers at the time. He produced several sculptures including La Fontaine des Danaïdes in Marseille or La Gravure  at the National Library, pediments, bas-reliefs on monuments, busts, fountains and ceilings of Parisian restaurants.

Works
 Ombres de Paolo et Francesca da Rimini, outline for the Prix de Rome, Musée d'Orsay, Paris, 1877
 Femme jouant avec son enfant, marble, La Piscine (museum of art and industry), Roubaix, 1880
 Œdipe à Colone, Musée d'Orsay, 1885
 La República Argentina, bronze, Escuela Técnica Raggio, Buenos Aires, 1889
 Limoges and Nantes, allegorical statues for the Gare de Tours, for architect Victor Laloux, 1898
 allegorical figures of Courage and Strength for the Hôtel de Ville, Tours, for Laloux, c. 1900
 La Muse de la source, font, marble and bronze, Musée d'Orsay, 1900
 La Misère, Jardin des Tuileries in Paris, 1907
 La Vigne, terracotta, Musée d'Orsay
 Buste de Melle Rateau, patinated plaster

References

External links
  Jean-Baptiste Hugues, on Culture.gouv.fr

1849 births
1930 deaths
Sculptors from Marseille
Prix de Rome for sculpture
20th-century French sculptors
19th-century French sculptors
French male sculptors
19th-century French male artists